Ağtala (also, Rodnikovka) is a village and municipality in the Khachmaz Rayon of Azerbaijan.  It has a population of 377.

References 

Populated places in Khachmaz District